Distratto is the debut extended play by Italian singer Francesca Michielin. It was released in Italy on 24 January 2012 through Sony Music Entertainment Italy. The EP peaked to number 9 on the Italian Albums Chart.

Singles
"Distratto" was released as the lead single from the album on 6 January 2012 after she won the fifth series of the Italian talent-show X Factor. The song peaked to number one on the Italian Singles Chart.

Track listing

Chart performance

Weekly charts

Release history

References

2012 EPs
Francesca Michielin albums